Edward L. (Ned) Wright (born August 25, 1947 in Washington, D.C.) is an American astrophysicist and cosmologist, well known for his achievements in the COBE, WISE, and WMAP projects and as a strong Big Bang proponent in web tutorials on cosmology and theory of relativity.

Wright received his ABscl (Physics in 1969) and PhD (Astronomy in 1976) degrees in high-altitude rocket measurement of cosmic microwave background radiation from Harvard University, where he was a junior fellow. After teaching as a tenured associate professor in the MIT Physics Department for a while, Wright has been a professor at UCLA since 1981.

Wright takes an interest in infrared astronomy and cosmology. He has studied fractal dust grains which are able to absorb and emit efficiently at millimeter wavelengths, and other aspects that may be important factors in drawing secrets from the cosmic microwave background. As an interdisciplinary scientist on the Space InfraRed Telescope Facility (SIRTF) Science Working Group, Wright has worked on the SIRTF project (renamed the Spitzer Space Telescope) since 1976. He was an active member of the teams working on the Cosmic Background Explorer (COBE) since 1978. He is the principal investigator of the Wide field Infrared Survey Explorer (WISE) project. Wright is also a member of the  current science team on the Wilkinson Microwave Anisotropy Probe (WMAP), which was launched in June 2001. WMAP is a mission to follow up the COBE discovery of early fluctuations in the developing Universe.

From 1994 to 1998, he served as a science editor of The Astrophysical Journal.

Honors and awards
 NASA Exceptional Scientific Achievement Medal for his work on COBE, in  1992.
 Named the CSEOL Distinguished Scientist of the Year, in 1995.
 Elected to the US National Academy of Sciences in 2011.
 Breakthrough Prize in Fundamental Physics, December 2017

References

External links 
 
 
 

20th-century American astronomers
21st-century American physicists
American cosmologists
Harvard College alumni
Harvard Graduate School of Arts and Sciences alumni
Massachusetts Institute of Technology School of Science faculty
University of California, Los Angeles faculty
Living people
1947 births
Members of the United States National Academy of Sciences